Jesús, Verbo No Sustantivo is the second studio album released in 1988 by Guatemalan singer-songwriter Ricardo Arjona.

Track listing 
All tracks by Ricardo Arjona

 "Jesús, verbo no sustantivo" (Jesus, Verb Not Noun) – 6:48
 "Hermanos del tiempo" (Brothers Of Time) – 3:55
 "Por qué es tan cruel el amor" (Why Is Love So Cruel) – 4:21
 "Uno + uno = uno" (One + One = One) – 4:10
 "S.O.S., rescátame" (S.O.S. Rescue Me) – 4:39
 "Guerrero a su guerra" (Warrior to Its War) – 3:48
 "Tú, mi amor" (You, My Love) – 3:29
 "Fuego de juventud" (Youth Fire) – 3:08
 "Como hacer a un lado el pasado" (How To Put The Past Aside) – 3:05
 "Creo que se trata de amor" (I Think It's About Love) – 2:47

Personnel 
 Ricardo Arjona – vocals

References 

(26-09-2011). "Arjona desclasifica los episodios menos glamorosos de su paso por las discográficas". Emol.com. Retrieved 15 October 2011.
Ricardo Arjona. MTV.com (US). Retrieved 23 March 2012.

External links 
 http://www.ricardoarjona.com/

1988 albums
Ricardo Arjona albums